Peter G. Loboda is a researcher of ancient history of the Northern Black Sea Region and antique numismatics. He is the founder and director of the Odessa Numismatics Museum.

Loboda graduated from the Odessa Marine Academy and worked as a naval officer. Since 1970 he has worked on the seagoing ships of the Black Sea Shipping Company all over the world.

Loboda is an hereditary numismatist. He concerned himself with numismatics since the 1960s, paying special attention to antique coins. He is the author of five books and numerous articles of numismatics of the Northern Black Sea Region, and a participant and lecturer in many scientific conferences. He founded the Odessa Numismatics Museum in 1999 and the Gallery "Monetary Yard" in 2004. Loboda donated his collection to the museum.

Loboda is an participant in Odessa's political life. Since 1991 he has been the President of the Odessa City Collectors' Society. He was the Deputy of Odessa City Council (1994–2002), the Adviser of City Council on cultural relations (2002–2010), Chairman of Board of Guardians of Odessa Regional Scientific Library named after M.Grushevsky (1997–2000) and Museum "Christian Odessa" (since 2004).

Loboda is the author and presenter of popular TV historical projects: "World of Collections", "About what the coin has told", "Projection of Time". He is also the author and presenter of youth TV program "Club of Discoverers". He meets and talks with schoolchildren and students about history of the Ukrainian State and history of Hero-city Odessa on a regular basis.

Awards 
Loboda has received government awards of Ukraine, Russia and Commonwealth of Independent States. He is the winner of Competition "Your names, Odessa" (2003). Honourable Medals of Odessa City Mayor (2009, 2011). Rewarded with Honourable Diploma of Ukrainian Parliament "For Special Services For Ukrainian People" (2004). Honorary Title "Deserved Culture Worker of Ukraine" (2009). Honourable Medal of Odessa Council of the Peace "For Humanism and Peacemaking" (2011). The winner of gallery of honourable philanthropists of Odessa Region "People of Generous Hearts" (2012).
His educational and humanitarian activity was marked by awards of the Ukrainian Orthodox Church, various Cossack's and public organizations.

References 
 Каменный А.Э. "Одесса: Кто есть Кто. 1794-1994". Литературно-энциклопедическое издание. - Одесса.: ОКФА, 1999. 544 с.: ил. - . с. 151 
 Энциклопедия. "Кто есть Кто в Одесском регионе". Часть 1 - Одесса.: "Эвен", 2007. 247 с.: ил. - . с. 121 
 Інститут біографічних досліджень. Ювіляри України: Події та особистості XXI століття. Випуск четвертий. - Київ, 2010. - 399 с.: ил. - . - с. 359. 
 Владимир Март, Валерий Чайка. «Одесса славна именами». Публицистическое издание. — Том 1. — Одесса: ПТ «Издательский центр», 2011. — 315 с.: ил. — С. 168 
 В.А.Анохин «Античные монеты Северного Причерноморья». – Киев: Издательский дом «Стилос», 2011. — 326 с.: ил. — . — с. 8, 10, 16, 42, 98, 206, 222, 248, 250, 264, 280, 318, 324, 326 
 Alexander Yurchenko. Travel to Cyberspace with Peter Loboda
 Alexander Yurchenko. Fourth Feat of Herakles
 К.В.Бабаев. Монеты Тмутараканского княжества - Москва, 2009. — 101 с.: ил. — . — с. 82-86. 
 В.И. Март, А.С. Троц, В.Ю. Чайка. «Имена эпохи нашей». — Том 1. — Одесса: Издательство «СМИЛ», 2012. — 268 с.: ил. — .- С. 92. 
 Морская энциклопедия Одессы. — Одесса: Издательство «Порты Украины», 2012. — 704 с.: ил. — . - С. 418. 
 Анатолий Троц. Одесса - народу. — Одесса: Издательство «СМИЛ», 2012. — 152 с.: ил. — .- С. 48-49. 
 Українська конфедерація журналістів. Золотий фонд нації: Національні лідери України. Україна, Європа, Світ. — Київ, 2014. — 527 с.: ил. — . — с. 217. 
 Трилогия «Живу с Одессой в сердце» . Выпуск I. Известные одесситы — Одесса: Издательство «Феникс», 2015. — 528 с.: ил. — .- С. 20-21. 
 Трилогия «Живу с Одессой в сердце» . Выпуск II. Известные одесские семьи — Одесса: Издательство «Феникс», 2016. — 656 с.: ил. — .- С. 38-47. 
 Трилогия «Живу с Одессой в сердце» . Выпуск III. Люди интересных профессий — Одесса: Издательство «Феникс», 2017. — 384 с.: ил. — .- С. 6-11. 
 Анна Бузиян, Наталья Карай. Идем на телек (из хроник Одесской студии телевидения). — Одесса: Издательство «Астропринт», 2018. — 471 с.: ил. — . — С. 431-433. 
 Алена Швец. Как одесситы получили шикарное наследство 
 Думская. Где ж «монетку смотреть» ? 
 Алена Швец. На какие деньги можно полюбоваться в Одесском музее нумизматики 
 Родион Сегедский. История моряка 
 Елена Киселева. Эти деньги принадлежат народу 
 Мария Гудыма. «Драхмы Древнего Пантикапея», или Одесса может потерять музей нумизматики 
Zimovniki Regional Museum. Mutual-relief “dolphin” from Olbia

External links 
Odessa Numismatics Museum
Decree of President of Ukraine 
Order of Odessa's Mayor 
Ukrainian Confederation of Journalists. Ukraine Jubilees 
YouTube 
Articles in PDF format.
Google - Album Archive

Numismatists
Writers from Odesa
Living people
Museum founders
Year of birth missing (living people)
Laureates of the Honorary Diploma of the Verkhovna Rada of Ukraine